Coelosuchus is an extinct genus of goniopholidid mesoeucrocodylian. Fossils have been found from the Graneros Shale of the Benton Group in Wyoming, and are of Cenomanian age. It was slightly over 1 meter in length.

References

Late Cretaceous crocodylomorphs of North America
Taxa named by Samuel Wendell Williston
Late Cretaceous reptiles of North America
Prehistoric pseudosuchian genera